That's My Amboy is a 2016 Philippine television drama romantic comedy series broadcast by GMA Network. It premiered on the network's Telebabad line up and worldwide on GMA Pinoy TV from January 25, 2016 to April 29, 2016 replacing Because of You.

Mega Manila ratings are provided by AGB Nielsen Philippines.

Series overview

Episodes

January 2016

February 2016

March 2016

April 2016

References

Lists of Philippine drama television series episodes